The following highways are numbered 277:

Brazil
 BR-277

Canada
 Nova Scotia Route 277
 Quebec Route 277

Japan
 Japan National Route 277

United States
 Interstate 277
 U.S. Route 277
 Alabama State Route 277
 Arizona State Route 277
 Florida State Road 277
 Georgia State Route 277 (former)
 K-277 (Kansas highway)
 Kentucky Route 277
 Maryland Route 277
 Minnesota State Highway 277
 Montana Secondary Highway 277
 New York State Route 277
 Pennsylvania Route 277 (former)
 South Carolina Highway 277
 Tennessee State Route 277
 Texas State Highway 277 (former)
 Texas State Highway Spur 277
 Farm to Market Road 277 (Texas)
 Utah State Route 277 (former)
 Virginia State Route 277